Agnès Monique Ohsan Bellepeau GOSK (born 1942) is a Mauritian politician and was the fourth vice president of Mauritius from November 2010 to April 2016. She was acting president of Mauritius from 31 March 2012 to 21 July 2012 when Sir Anerood Jugnauth resigned up to the inauguration of Kailash Purryag to the office. She was again acting president from 29 May 2015 to 5 June 2015 when Kailash Purryag resigned up to the inauguration of Ameenah Gurib to the office.

Career
Monique Ohsan Bellepeau was a journalist and a news announcer on the national TV channel, the Mauritius Broadcasting Corporation.

She won the parliamentary elections and was appointed as Vice President on 12 November 2010 following the death of Vice President Angidi Chettiar. She was elected unanimously by all members of the National Assembly to become the first female Vice President of Mauritius. Ohsan Bellepeau was a member of the Mauritian Labor Party and later became the President of the Party. She is the daughter of Bartholomée Ohsan, who was a founding member of the party.

On 30 March 2012, Mauritius president Anerood Jugnauth resigned after a feud with the country's prime minister, leaving the presidential chair to vice-president Ohsan Bellepeau. She was succeeded as President by Kailash Purryag on 21 July 2012.

On 29 May 2015, President Kailash Purryag resigned, leaving the presidential chair again to vice-president Ohsan Bellepeau. She was succeeded as President by Ameenah Gurib on 5 June 2015.

Private life
She was married to Yves Joseph Bellepeau, who was a businessman. He died on 16 November 2010, three days after she was sworn in as Vice President.

Honours and decorations
 :
  Grand Commander of the Order of the Star and Key of the Indian Ocean (2010)

References

|-

|-

1942 births
Living people
21st-century women politicians
Female heads of state
Labour Party (Mauritius) politicians
Grand Officers of the Order of the Star and Key of the Indian Ocean
Mauritian journalists
Mauritian women journalists
Mauritian women in politics
Presidents of Mauritius
Vice-presidents of Mauritius
Women television journalists
Women vice presidents
20th-century journalists
21st-century journalists